God and Satan may refer to:

God and Satan
"God and Satan" (song), a song by Biffy Clyro
"God and Satan", essay by philosopher Alan Watts republished 1953 in Myth and Ritual in Christianity

See also
Book of Job chapter 1
God as the Devil in Christian heresiology
 God (disambiguation)
 Satan (disambiguation)